Pramadom  is a village in Pathanamthitta district in the state of Kerala, India.

Demographics
 India census, Pramadom had a population of 16908 with 7996 males and 8912 females. The only indoor stadium in Pathanamthitta district is in Pramadom. It was built at a cost of Rs.2 crore on 0.15 hectare of land along the Konni-Poonkavu road. The temple representing lord "Ayappa" is also situated on the Pathanamthitta Poonkavu road.

See also 

 Pathanamthitta
 Vazhamuttom
 Thazhoor Bhagavathy Kshetram(temple)
 River Achankovil

References

Villages in Pathanamthitta district